Back Beat Records was an American record label launched in 1957, as the Houston-based soul sub-label of Duke Records, when it was run by Don Robey.  ABC Records assumed ownership of Back Beat on May 23, 1973, as part of ABC's acquisition of Back Beat's parent label Duke. The label's biggest hits included "Treat Her Right" by Roy Head & The Traits, "Tell Me Why" by Norman Fox & The Rob-Roys and "Everlasting Love" by Carl Carlton. The last of these was the title cut of an album intended to be issued on Back Beat in December 1974, but ABC ended up issuing the album on their main label, as they had discontinued Back Beat at the last minute.

There are many records from Back Beat that found fame but not fortune, as the records are part of the underground movement known as Northern soul. Carl Carlton probably recorded the most tracks that fall into the Northern soul sound.

Back Beat label variations

Independent distribution
 1957-1959: White, lime green and dark blue "kettle drum" label
 1959-1973: Red, white and yellow label with yellow drumsticks

ABC distribution
 1973-1974: White and red label with yellow drumsticks 
 1974: Dark green and blue label with "abc Back Beat" ("abc" circle logo) between two lines, all in white.  Only one record was released with this format: "Everlasting Love" by Carl Carlton (BB 27001, originally released on the white and red label)

Back Beat recording artists 
 Carl Carlton (born 1952)
 Bobby Doyle (1939–2006)
 Norman Fox & The Rob-Roys
 Roy Head (1941-2020)
 Joe Hinton (1929–1968)
 Eddie Wilson
 Doodle Owens (1939–1999)
 O.V. Wright (1939–1980)

See also 
 List of record labels

References

External links 
 Back Beat discography at www.soulfulkindamusic.net, founded by Dave Godin (1936–2004)
 Back Beat discography at www.45cat.com
 The Story of Roy Head and The Traits

American record labels
Record labels established in 1957
Record labels disestablished in 1976
Soul music record labels
Defunct record labels of the United States
Blues record labels